Hibiscus (born George Edgerly Harris III; September 6, 1949 – May 6, 1982) was an American actor and performance artist. Starting his career in New York City, he moved to San Francisco, where in the early 1970s he founded the psychedelic gay liberation theater collective known as the Cockettes.

He was widely seen in Flower Power (1967), a photograph taken during a major anti-Vietnam War protest in Washington, DC. He was photographed putting flowers into the gun barrels of the MPs.

Early life
Harris was born in Bronxville, New York in 1949 to George Harris II and Ann M. Harris. The family moved to Clearwater Beach, Florida. The Harris parents became interested in theater and began performing with a local community theater called "The Little Theater". George and his siblings started a children's theater troupe, the El Dorado Players.

In 1964, the family returned to New York. Harris appeared in commercials, and started acting in television. In 1966 he performed in an Off Broadway play titled Peace Creeps by John Wolfson, with Al Pacino and James Earl Jones.

In 1967, George Harris III and his father appeared in New York in the Off-Off-Broadway play Gorilla Queen by Ronald Tavel.

War protest

On October 21, 1967, Hibiscus (then George Harris) joined the March on the Pentagon, an anti-war march intended to "levitate" the Pentagon. He appears in Bernie Boston's Pulitzer Prize-nominated photograph, Flower Power; he was the turtleneck sweater-wearing protester photographed putting flowers into the gun barrels of a soldier of the 503rd Military Police Battalion (Airborne).

Boston recalled the moment in a 2005 interview in Curio magazine:

1960's counter-culture member Paul Krassner, in a blog entry he did not post until a week after Bernie Boston died in 2008 (and three years after Boston was quoted in Curio), states that the young man in the photo was Joel Tornabene, a leader of the Youth International Party; in addition to Boston, both Harris/Hibiscus and Tornabene were dead before Krassner posted this statement.

The Cockettes
Hibiscus, whose full beard, vintage dresses, make-up and costume jewelry created a defiant look, even by later standards, embraced drag and drugs as paths to spiritual liberation, and attracted a group of like-minded hippies who loved show-tunes, dressing up, showing off and dropping acid, and became The Cockettes.

The Cockettes decked themselves out in drag outfits and glitter for a series of legendary midnight musicals at the Palace Theater in San Francisco's California North Beach neighborhood. They quickly became a "must-see" for San Francisco's gay community, with their outlandishly decadent productions like "Journey to the Center of Uranus", "Tinsel Tarts in a Hot Coma" and "Gone with the Showboat to Oklahoma". Two notable Cockettes were the disco diva darling Sylvester and the "queen of B-movie filth" Divine, who sang "If there's a crab on Uranus you know you've been loved" while dressed as a psychedelic crab queen.

When the Cockettes wanted to start charging for their shows, Hibiscus left, believing all shows should be free, and formed the Angels of Light in San Francisco, which gave many free theatrical performances in the early 1970s in San Francisco and New York City. After moving back to New York, he put together a number of off-off Broadway revues, of which Sky High ran the longest. He also appeared in a daytime soap opera under his birth name. In the early 1980s, he and his sisters Jayne Anne, Eloise and Mary Lou and brother Fred, formed the glitter rock group "Hibiscus and the Screaming Violets", supported by musicians Ray Ploutz on bass, Bill Davis on guitar and Michael Pedulla on drums.

Hibiscus died of Kaposi's sarcoma due to complications from AIDS on May 6, 1982, at St. Vincent's Hospital in New York City. He was an early AIDS casualty; at the time of his death the new illness was still referred to as GRID.

References

External links 
 

1949 births
1982 deaths
20th-century American male actors
AIDS-related deaths in New York (state)
American anti–Vietnam War activists
American drag queens
American gay actors
LGBT people from California
LGBT people from New York (state)
People from the San Francisco Bay Area
Radical Faeries members
20th-century American LGBT people